The following is a list of all team-to-team transactions that have occurred in the National Hockey League (NHL) during the 2019–20 NHL season. It lists which team each player has been traded to, signed by, or claimed by, and for which player(s) or draft pick(s), if applicable. Players who have retired or released are also listed. The 2019–20 NHL trade deadline was on February 24, 2020. Players traded or claimed off waivers after this date were not eligible to play in the 2020 Stanley Cup playoffs.

Retirement

Contract terminations
A team and player may mutually agree to terminate a player's contract at any time. All players must clear waivers before having a contract terminated.

Buyouts can only occur at specific times of the year. For more details on contract terminations as buyouts:

Teams may buy out player contracts (after the conclusion of a season) for a portion of the remaining value of the contract, paid over a period of twice the remaining length of the contract. This reduced number and extended period is applied to the cap hit as well.
If the player was under the age of 26 at the time of the buyout the player's pay and cap hit will reduced by a factor of 2/3 over the extended period. 
If the player was 26 or older at the time of the buyout the player's pay and cap hit will reduced by a factor of 1/3 over the extended period. 
If the player was 35 or older at the time of signing the contract the player's pay will be reduced by a factor of 1/3, but the cap hit will not be reduced over the extended period.

Injured players cannot be bought out.

Free agency
Note: This does not include players who have re-signed with their previous team as an unrestricted free agent or as a restricted free agent.

Offer sheets
An offer sheet is a contract offered to a restricted free agent by a team other than the one for which his rights are owned by. If the player signs the offer sheet, his current team has seven days to match the contract offer and keep the player or else he goes to the team that gave the offer sheet, with compensation going to his first team.

Imports
This section is for players who were not previously on contract with NHL teams in the past season. Listed is the last team and league they were under contract with.

Trades
* Retained Salary Transaction: Each team is allowed up to three contracts on their payroll where they have retained salary in a trade (i.e. the player no longer plays with Team A due to a trade to Team B, but Team A still retains some salary). Only up to 50% of a player's contract can be kept, and only up to 15% of a team's salary cap can be taken up by retained salary. A contract can only be involved in one of these trades twice.

Hover over retained salary or conditional transactions for more information.

June

July

August

September

October

November

December

January

February

August (2020)

September (2020)

October (2020)

Waivers 
Once an NHL player has played in a certain number of games or a set number of seasons has passed since the signing of his first NHL contract (see here), that player must be offered to all of the other NHL teams before he can be assigned to a minor league affiliate.

See also
2019–20 NHL season
2019 NHL Entry Draft
2020 NHL Entry Draft
2019 in sports
2020 in sports
2018–19 NHL transactions
2020–21 NHL transactions

References

National Hockey League transactions
transactions